Ferdows Rural District is a rural district (dehestan) in Ferdows District, Rafsanjan County, Kerman Province, Iran. At the 2006 census, its population (including Safayyeh, which was later detached from the rural district and promoted to city status) was 6,889, in 1,785 families; excluding Safayyeh, the population (as of 2006) was 4,928, in 1,286 families. The rural district has 27 villages.

References 

Rural Districts of Kerman Province
Rafsanjan County